Fripp is a surname. Notable people with the surname include:

 Alfie Fripp (1913 - 2013), British airman
 Alfred Downing Fripp (artist) (1822 - 1895), British watercolourist
 Alfred Downing Fripp (surgeon) (1865 - 1930), British physician
 Alfred Ernest Fripp (1866 – 1938), Canadian lawyer and politician
 Edgar Innes Fripp (1861 – 1931), Unitarian minister and English antiquarian 
 George Arthur Fripp (1813 - 1896), British watercolourist
 Johnny Fripp (1921–2022), Canadian skier and football player
 Robert Fripp (born 1946), British guitarist